Social invisibility refers to a group of people in the society who have been separated or systematically ignored by the majority of the public. As a result, those who are marginalized feel neglected or being invisible in the society. It can include elderly homes, child orphanages, homeless people or anyone who experiences a sense of ignored or separated from society as a whole.

Psychological consequences

The subjective experience of being unseen by others in a social environment is social invisibility. A sense of disconnectedness from the surrounding world is often experienced by invisible people. This disconnectedness can lead to absorbed coping and breakdowns, based on the asymmetrical relationship between someone made invisible and others.

Among African-American men, invisibility can often take the form of a psychological process that both deals with the stress of racialized invisibility, and the choices made in becoming visible within a social framework that predetermines these choices. In order to become visible and gain acceptance, an African-American man has to avoid adopting behavior that made him invisible in the first place, which intensifies the stress already brought on through racism.

See also 
 Color-blind
 Invisibility
 Marginalization
 International Transgender Day of Visibility

References

Social networks
Invisibility
Social rejection
Passing (sociology)
Censorship